De Mantel der Liefde  is a 1978 Dutch satirical anthology film, directed by Adriaan Ditvoorst. It is a black comedy based on the Ten Commandments and mankind's failure to live up to them.

Plot

The film starts off with Jesus Christ and Moses, who are sent from Antiquity to the present to see if mankind followed up the Ten Commandments? The film is divided in ten self-contained sketches, named after one of the Commandments each.  Every sketch shows people sinning against the Commandments. Near the end the director and his producer (Hans Boskamp) watch their own film reach its conclusion. The producer feels the movie "sucks" and is "too vulgar", whereupon the director defends it by saying it's actually "art". The producer then replies that "art doesn't sell" and "stupid entertainment is what the public wants."

Cast
 Willeke van Ammelrooy: Maria
 Tim Beekman: Bakker
 Marjan Berk: Annie
 Ronnie Bierman: Gerda
 Anne Wil Blankers: Anne
 Hans Boskamp: Moses / producer
 Bertus Botterman: Vader
 Adrian Brine: Abortionist
 Hans Cornelissen: Jongen
 Hans Croiset: Minister
 Jules Croiset: Pastor
 Rijk de Gooyer: Cor
 Wim van der Grijn: Cyclist
 Liëla Koguchi: Ms. Split
 Mimi Kok: Baker's wife
 Joost Prinsen: Jesus / director

References

External links 
 

Dutch comedy films
Dutch satirical films
1978 films
1970s Dutch-language films
Anthology films
Religious satire films
Self-reflexive films
Portrayals of Jesus in film
Cultural depictions of Moses
Films shot in the Netherlands
Films set in the Netherlands
Films about abortion
Ten Commandments
Films directed by Adriaan Ditvoorst